Eric Hung (born 1 November 1967) is a Taiwanese music producer.

Hung was named the best album producer alongside his brother Chris at the 7th Golden Melody Awards in 1996. He produced Flower of Love in 2010, a tribute album to his father Ang It-hong, and won the same prize at the 22nd Golden Melody Awards in 2011.

In 2013, Hung served as music director for Jerry Fan's musical Dancing Diva. Later that year, Hung led several thousand people in singing Children’s Sky, a song by Ian Chen of the band F.I.R. and songwriter Kiki Hu, at a demonstration against the use of nuclear energy.

References

External links

1967 births
Living people
Taiwanese record producers
Musicians from Tainan